"Burn" is a song by the Chicago-based punk rock band Alkaline Trio, released as the third single from their 2005 album Crimson. It peaked at #34 on the UK Singles Chart. The single was released as both a compact disc and a pair of vinyl 7-inches, each containing different demo, remix, and alternate versions of the song as B-sides. An additional remix version, the "Alleged remix", was released on the Underworld: Evolution: Original Motion Picture Soundtrack.

The song's music video, directed by Piper Ferguson, depicts the band performing "Burn" in a circus setting accompanied by acrobats, contortionists, and other performers. As the song progresses fire is introduced into the performers' acts, and they dance and perform amidst the flames. Bassist Dan Andriano is depicted playing a double bass, though the song is actually performed using a standard bass guitar, and drummer Derek Grant is depicted playing a makeshift drum kit composed of pots, pans, and other objects.

Track listing

CD version

The data portion of the enhanced CD consists of the music video for "Burn".

7" version 1

7" version 2

Personnel

Band
Matt Skiba – guitar, lead vocals
Dan Andriano – bass, backing vocals
Derek Grant – drums

Additional musicians
Roger Joseph Manning Jr. – keyboards

Production
Jerry Finn – producer, mix engineer
Ryan Hewitt – engineer
Seth Waldmann – assistant engineer
Dave Collins – mastering

References 

Alkaline Trio songs
2006 singles
2005 songs
Songs written by Matt Skiba
Songs written by Dan Andriano
Songs written by Derek Grant (drummer)
Vagrant Records singles